Textbooks in Israel and the Palestinian territories issued by the Palestinian Authority (PA) have been an issue within the larger Israeli–Palestinian conflict.

Several studies have been done on Palestinian textbooks. The U.S. Consulate General in Jerusalem commissioned studies from IPCRI – Israel/Palestine Center for Research and Information. In Europe the  performed research. The Hebrew University's Harry S. Truman Research Institute for the Advancement of Peace has also published papers on this issue. A U.S. Senate subcommittee and the Political Committee of the European Parliament have both held hearings about Palestinian textbooks. 

In 2021, the European Parliament condemned UNRWA on the grounds that its textbooks call for the destruction of Israel and glorify violence. In 2022, the European Parliament's Budgetary Control Committee also condemned the Palestinian Authority (PA) for using EU funds to create school books containing violent and hateful content. The committee based its decision on a report by IMPACT-SE which listed troubling references throughout all grades and subjects to anti-Semitic content and imagery, hate speech, and incitement to violence, martyrdom, and jihad. According to the EU-commissioned Georg Eckert Institute, Palestinian textbooks display anti-Semitic narratives.

Textbooks in Israel also have been studied and some problems found. Israel has ordered the word Nakba, meaning disaster or catastrophe and which refers to the foundation of Israel in 1948 and the subsequent forced flight of the Palestinians from Israel-captured land, to be removed from Israeli Arab textbooks. The term was introduced in books for use in Arab schools in 2007 when the Education Ministry was run by Yuli Tamir of the Labor party. Israeli Prime Minister Benjamin Netanyahu justified the ban by saying that the term was "propaganda against Israel."

Israel has used the issue as a cornerstone of its Hasbara campaign against the Palestinian Authority. Palestinians say that their textbooks rightly focus on their own national narrative, which includes the privations of life under occupation.

International assessment

1998 UNRWA review
In 1998, two years before the Second Intifada, Democratic member of United States House of Representatives Peter Deutsch and other congressmembers directed the State Department to ask UNRWA to investigate evidence that school books used in UNRWA-run schools in the West Bank and Gaza contained anti-Semitic statements. The allegations surfaced in reports compiled by the Center for Monitoring the Impact of Peace, an NGO. In January 1999, the State Department reported "The methodologies employed by UNRWA make it difficult to draw firm conclusions about the extent of anti-Semitic content in host authority textbooks used in UNRWA schools. At the same time, UNRWA's review did reveal instances of anti-Semitic characterizations and content in those host authority texts."

2000 CMIP report
An analysis of Israeli textbooks in 2000 by the Center for Monitoring the Impact of Peace (CMIP) found that there was no indoctrination against the Arabs as a nation, nor a negative presentation of Islam. Islam, Arab culture and the Arabs' contribution to human civilization were presented in a positive light. No book called for violence or war, and many books reportedly expressed the yearning for peace between Israel and the Arab countries. However, some textbooks within the Orthodox Jewish community were found to contain prejudices towards Palestinians and the Arabs were often held responsible for Israel's wars.

In 2001, in Democracy, History, and the contest over the Palestinian curriculum, Nathan J. Brown wrote 'the Palestinian curriculum is not a war curriculum; while highly nationalistic, it does not incite hatred, violence, and anti-Semitism. It cannot be described as a "peace curriculum" either, but the charges against it are often wildly exaggerated or inaccurate.' In the same document, he also wrote that 'virtually every discussion in English on Palestinian education repeats the charge that Palestinian textbooks incite students against Jews and Israel. It may therefore come as a surprise to readers that the books authored under the PNA are largely innocent of these charges.'

2000 and 2001 Nathan Brown
Since 1994 the Palestinian Authority had been replacing older textbooks, and in 1999 and 2000, Nathan Brown, Professor of Political Science at George Washington University, published a study on this subject. Regarding the Palestinian Authority's newer textbooks, he states:
The new books have removed the more blatant anti-Semitism present in the older books while they tell history from a Palestinian point of view, they do not represent the State of Israel and often label it as "Palestine"; each book contains a foreword describing the West Bank and Gaza as "the two parts of the homeland"; the maps take some other measures to avoid indicating borders; the books avoid treating Israel at length but do indeed mention it by name; the new books must be seen as a tremendous improvement from a Jewish, Israeli, and humanitarian view.

2001 European Union discussion on halting aid
Armin Laschet, a member of the German delegation to the European Union's Parliament threatened to halt EU funding of Palestinian educational institutions "...until all the Palestinian textbook passages antagonistic to Israel are removed". Particular examples of anti-Israel and anti-Semitic indoctrination found in the textbooks includes an Islamic high school text that warns students to be wary of Jews as they are "...deceitful and disloyal". Another textbook stated that European anti-Semitism was caused by Jewish greed and fanaticism. Other examples led François Zimeray, a French socialist, to state that there is "...substantial proof that EU funding has wrongly been used to finance school textbooks promoting hatred and inciting to martyrdom".

However, Chris Patten, on the Foreign Affairs Committee of the European Parliament, and External Relations Commissioner stated that "It is a total fabrication that the European Union has funded textbooks with anti-Semitic arguments within them in Palestinian schools. It is a complete lie."

The PA response was delivered by Peter Hansen, at the time the Commissioner-General of UNRWA, in the daily Al-Hayat al-Jadida: "We cannot expect a people under occupation to have textbooks which idealize, praise and express love for their occupiers." In response the American-Israeli Cooperative Enterprise stated "Israeli texts do not 'idealize, praise and express love' for the Palestinians, but they do not malign or disseminate hatred against them either."

While the PA deputy minister for education denied that books with these statements were used in the schools, Yasser Arafat did confirm their usage. Arafat excused their use claiming that these were old Jordanian textbooks and that the PA lacked sufficient funding to replace them with more modern ones. To this claim, Laschet responded that as the EU was donating 300 million Euros to the PA, that the PA "...certainly can bear the cost of publishing new textbooks".

2002 Georg Eckert Institute comparison
The Georg Eckert Institute for International Textbook Research compared Palestinian and Israeli textbooks in December 2002. According to Jonathan Kriener of the institute, "The crucial difference between both sets of textbooks lies in the overall unanimity of the Palestinian textbooks which conveys a constant underlying message of delegitimization versus the broad spectrum of different approaches in Israel, ranging from Ultra-orthodox school books, to books in which highly controversial political issues are discussed quite openly."

2002 and 2004 Firer-Adwan comparisons
Ruth Firer of the Harry S. Truman Institute for the Advancement of Peace at the Hebrew University of Jerusalem and Sami Adwan, a professor of education at Bethlehem University in Bethlehem, compared Palestinian and Israeli textbooks in 2002. Of the Palestinian textbooks they found that "[a]ccording to the everyday experience of Palestinians, modern-day Israelis are presented as occupiers. The texts include examples of Israelis killing and imprisoning Palestinians, demolishing their homes, uprooting fruit trees, and confiscating their lands and building settlements on them. The texts also talk about the right of return for the 1948 Palestinian refugees when describing how those refugees live in camps." The Israeli textbooks are generally "presented without the national-political debate". Their 2004 study of 13 Israeli textbooks and 9 Palestinian textbooks found that "neither side's books tell the story of the conflict from the other's viewpoint, both ignore the other side's suffering and each counts only its only victims".

2002 review and 2004 follow-up report by IPCRI
In 2002, the United States Congress requested the United States Department of State to commission a reputable non-governmental organization (NGO) to conduct a review of the new Palestinian curriculum. The Israel/Palestine Center for Research and Information (IPCRI) was thereby commissioned by the U.S. Embassy in Tel Aviv and the US Consul General in Jerusalem to review the Palestinian Authority's textbooks. Its report, completed in March 2003, stated the "overall orientation of the curriculum is peaceful despite the harsh and violent realities on the ground. It does not openly incite against Israel and the Jews. It does not openly incite hatred and violence. Religious and political tolerance is emphasized in a good number of textbooks and in multiple contexts."

However, its June 2004 follow-up report stated that "the practice of "appropriating" sites, areas, localities, geographic regions, etc. inside the territory of the State of Israel as Palestine/Palestinian observed in our previous review, remains a feature of the newly published textbooks (4th and 9th Grade) laying substantive grounds to the contention that the Palestinian Authority did not in fact recognize Israel as the State of the Jewish people."

Regarding maps, it noted that "a good number... show Israel, the West Bank and the Gaza Strip as one geographic entity (without demarcation lines or differentiated colorings). Historically Palestinian cities (e.g., Akka, Yafa, Haifa, Safad, al-Lid, Ar-Ramla, Beer As-sabe') are included in some maps that lump together the areas controlled by the PA with those inside the State of Israel. No map of the region bears the name of "Israel" in its pre-1967 borders. In addition, Israeli towns with a predominantly Jewish population are not represented on these maps."

The Summary also stated that the curriculum asserts a historically contentious ancient Arab presence in the region, while reflecting an inadequate and imbalanced representation of the Jewish connection: "The Jewish connection to the region, in general, and the Holy Land, in particular, is virtually missing. This lack of reference is perceived as tantamount to a denial of such a connection, although no direct evidence is found for such a denial." ... "terms and passages used to describe some historical events are sometimes offensive in nature and could be construed as reflecting hatred of and discrimination against Jews and Judaism".

According to Roger Avenstrup, writing in The New York Times, the 2003 report from IPCRI concludes that overall the curriculum is peaceful and does not contain hatred or violence against Israel or the Jews, whilst the 2004 report states that there are 'no signs of promoting hatred toward Israel, Judaism or Zionism, nor toward the Western Judeo-Christian tradition or values.'

2009 US State Department's Human Rights report
In its 2009 Human Rights report, the U.S. State Department wrote that after the 2006 revision of textbooks by the PA Ministry of Education and Higher Education, international academics concluded that books did not incite violence against Jews but showed imbalance, bias, and inaccuracy. Some maps did not depict the current political reality, showing neither Israel nor the settlements. Palestinian textbooks used in Palestinian schools and schools in East Jerusalem run by the Jerusalem municipality were inconsistent in defining the 1967 borders, and did not label areas and cities with both Arabic and Hebrew names.

2009-2012 report 
A comprehensive three-year study, regarded by its researchers as 'the most definitive and balanced study to date on the topic', was conducted between 2009 and 2012. The researchers examined 3,000 authors, illustrations, and maps in school books used in Palestinian, Israeli state, and Israeli ultra-Orthodox schools. The study found that incitement, demonization or negative depictions of the other in children's education was "extremely rare" in both Israeli and Palestinian school texts, with only 6 instances discovered in over 9,964 pages of Palestinian textbooks, none of which consisted of "general dehumanising characterisations of personal traits of Jews or Israelis". Israeli officials rejected the study as biased, while Palestinian Authority officials claimed it vindicated their view that their textbooks are as fair and balanced as Israel's.

2013 CRIHL study
In 2009 a study was launched by the Council for Religious Institutions in the Holy Land, an interfaith association of Jewish, Christian, and Muslim leaders in Israel and the Occupied Territories, which planned on making recommendations to both sides' Education Ministries based on the report. It was supervised by a psychiatrist, Prof. emeritus Bruce Wexler of Yale University and his NGO – A Different Future and commissioned a joint Palestinian-Israeli research team headed by Professors Daniel Bar-Tal (Tel Aviv University) and Sami Adwan (Bethlehem University), which employed research assistants (6 Israeli and 4 Palestinian bilingual research assistants) to analyse texts of 370 Israeli and 102 Palestinian books from grades 1 to 12. Both The Guardian and AAP mention 3000 approved textbooks from 2011 as subject to the study's analysis, including those used in the ultra-Orthodox Jewish community's educational system. The Israel ministry of education's Arabic texts for Israeli Arab schools were omitted from the survey.

The study, overseen by an international Scientific Advisory Panel (SAP), was to proceed in three phases: organization, analysis, and review, and was projected to draw up its conclusions by May 2012. The study was funded by the United States State Department. The Palestinian National Authority cooperated with the researchers while Israel withheld formal participation.

The results of the comprehensive in-depth survey, entitled "Victims of Our Own Narratives? Portrayal of the 'Other' in Israeli and Palestinian School Books", were announced in February 2013, in a statement signed by most members of the advisory panel, with the exception of several members, including Jerusalem physician Elihu Richter, who believes the method might understate Palestinian incitement, and of Arnon Groiss, who had not read the final report and also had doubts about the methodology employed. The advisory council statement attested to the high quality of the scientific standards used, and underwrote the findings. Complaints were made that they had not been given an advanced copy of the final report. One anonymous SAP member likened the potential impact of the study to the Goldstone Report.

The image of the "other"
The study found that, while most schoolbooks on either side were factually accurate, both Israel and the Palestinians failed to adequately and positively represent each other, and presented "exclusive unilateral national narratives". 40% of Israeli, and 15% of Palestinian textbooks were judged to contain neutral depictions of the other. While the majority of both countries' textbooks represent the other as the enemy, Israeli state school texts were more likely to portray Palestinians in a positive light, with 11% of their textbooks and 1% of Palestinian textbooks, viewing the other positively. Some Israeli state school texts include criticism of Israel's actions, while both Palestinian and Haredi Orthodox schools used textbooks that were "overwhelmingly negative in their depiction of the other". One Israeli civics textbooks included self-criticism, an 11th-grade civics reader that refers to the 1948 Deir Yassin massacre as the "killing of dozens of helpless Arabs" and the key cause of the 1948 Palestinian exodus. Likewise, a 4th-grade Israeli book included a story about a Palestinian who came to the rescue of a wounded Israeli soldier out of his "obligation as a Muslim Arab". Such material was found, however, to be exceptional. One Israel state school textbook referred to Arabs as "masses of the wild nation"; an ultra-Orthodox text wrote of a "convoy of bloodthirsty Arabs" and of a village that was a "nest of murderers". Another called Israel "a little lamb in a sea of seventy wolves", referring to Arab nations. Various Palestinian texts included negative language that referred to the "Zionist occupation", the "usurpation of Palestine", and to an Israeli prison as a "slaughterhouse". Both sides' textbooks contained references to martyrdom and dying for one's land and liberty. Overall negative or very negative representations of Palestinians occurred 49% of the time in Israeli state school, 73% in Haredi, as opposed to 84% in Palestinian, textbooks. Highly negative characterizations were discerned in 26% of Israeli state school books and 50% of the Palestinian ones. Depictions of the "other" as enemy occurred 75% in Israeli, and in 81% of Palestinian textbooks.

Educating towards peace; maps
Israeli schoolbooks were deemed superior to Palestinian ones with regard to preparing children for peace, but the study praised both Israel and the Palestinian Authority for producing textbooks almost completely unblemished by "dehumanizing and demonizing characterizations of the other". The study appeared to undermine a charge, often used by Israel to delegitimize Palestinian claims that they were ready for statehood, according to which Palestinians were "educated to hate". With regard to maps, 4% of Palestinian maps mark the Green Line, or label the area west of it as "Israel", 6 out of 10 omit borders, while another third include the green line without reference to Israel; 76% of Israeli textbook maps fail to distinguish the Palestinian territories and Israel, and the Palestinian areas lack labelling, implying that the Palestinian areas form part of Israel.

Criticism from panel members
There were critical voices from among the study's Scientific Advisory Panel (SAP). Jerusalem physician Elihu Richter believed the method applied might understate Palestinian incitement. Dr. Arnon Groiss, who was on the SAP of the study and in the past conducted an independent research of Palestinian, Egyptian, Syrian, Saudi Arabian, Tunisian and Iranian schoolbooks between 2000 and 2010, has highly criticized the study methodology and subsequent conclusions. Groiss objected, inter alia, to the selection of the Study Material ("highly demonizing pieces were not included, under the pretext that they were not explicit enough", "explicit denial...was not included too"), to the categorization methods ("real cases of ignoring the 'other' deliberately without degrading him slipped away from scrutiny", false positive descriptions) and to the analysis itself ("There is no attempt to study the quotes more deeply and draw conclusions", "the report considers Jihad and martyrdom as values, which is acceptable academically, but it fails to evaluate their impact on the issues of war and peace"). Groiss concluded that "the main question, namely, to what extent is this or that party engaged in actual education for peace, if at all, has not been answered by the report itself."

Reactions
Israeli spokesmen attacked the report before its results were released. The Ministry of Education, justifying the decision to deny cooperation to the project, states that it was "biased, unprofessional and significantly lacking in objectivity", asserting that it refused to cooperate "elements who are interested in maliciously slandering the Israeli educational system and the state of Israel". Likud party member and Israeli Education Minister Gideon Saar, branded the report "biased, unprofessional and profoundly unobjective", criticizing it as an "attempt to create a parallel between the Israeli and Palestinian educational systems without any foundation whatsoever".
Salam Fayyad, the Palestinian premier, welcomed the study, and commented that it "confirms that Palestinian textbooks do not contain any form of blatant incitement, which is based on contempt towards the 'other'". He also noted that the Palestinian Ministry of Education had been instructed the "to study the report thoroughly and to use its conclusions... to develop school curriculums", based on "principles of coexistence, tolerance, justice, and human dignity".
The Israel Government Press Office announced that Yossi Kuperwasser, director-general of the Strategic Affairs Ministry, would provide fresh data documenting incitement in the PA education system.
The US State Department, through its spokesperson Victoria Nuland, said the Department had funded the study to enable the Council of Religious Institutions to pursue its objectives of peace and religious tolerance in national curriculums, and stated that the U.S. would abstain from taking a position on the study's findings.
The Anti-Defamation League came out in support of the Israeli Education Ministry's criticism, declaring that the report was "distorted and counterproductive".

2019 Report by UN Committee on the Elimination of Racial Discrimination 
In 2019, the UN Committee on the Elimination of Racial Discrimination (CERD) released a report that, among other points, encouraged the Palestinian Authority, to ensure textbooks and school curricula did not contain offensive comments and images.

2019-2021 Georg Eckert Institute Report 
In 2021, a new report was published by the EU-commissioned Georg Eckert Institute. Out of 309 available volumes, 156 were chosen. The selection process was based on ensuring a balanced ratio of books from each of the three years in which they were published, including all subjects and school years.

The report found that while several sections and chapters are devoted to topics such as tolerance and human rights, there are also narratives that are anti-Semitic and glorify violence. The textbook analysis did not reveal any direct calls for violence against Israelis. However, the analysis did expose portrayals that defend and sometimes support violence against Israelis - who are typically called 'Zionist occupiers'.

 Palestinian attacks against Israeli civilians during the 1970s are not condemned but rather portrayed as a legitimate method of resistance.
 Acts of terrorism, including those committed by Dalal al-Mughrabi, are cited as an example of self-sacrificing 'resistance'.
 In maps of the region, Israel is absent and Israeli cities founded by Jews, like Tel Aviv, are not shown.
 The textbooks prefer to use the term ‘Zionist occupation’ instead of mentioning Israel.
 In one case, Jews are collectively depicted as enemies of Muhammad who attempted to kill him; this accusation is later linked with the Israeli-Palestinian conflict.

In March 2020, a Westminster Hall debate on the EU review noted that in 2017, Sabri Saidam, the PA’s Minister of Education, said that the removal of Israel from maps and the glorification of the so-called martyrs are a product of “the ripple effects” of the Israeli-Palestinian conflict.

Studies by Israel-affiliated organizations

2006 Israeli Defense Ministry study
In the 2004–2005 school year, the Palestinian Education Ministry published 29 new textbooks for the fifth and tenth grades. According to a 2006 study by Noa Meridor, a researcher in the Israel Defense Ministry's office of the Coordinator of Government Activities in the Territories, the new Palestinian curriculum "shows a continuing denial of the State of Israel's right to exist and a continuing cultivation of the values of armed struggle against Israel. The books contain incitement against the State of Israel and the Zionist movement, one of them even employing anti-Semitism." 
Among the examples listed in the study: 
 The books claim that the only ancient inhabitants of Israel were Arabs, ignoring any ancient Jewish presence: "Concentrated ... in the land of Al-Sham [Greater Syria] ... was the culture of the Canaanite and Aramaic peoples who migrated there from the Arab peninsula."
 The books teach that the First Zionist Congress fostered the Zionist State based on a secret decision of what came to be known as the Protocols of the Elders of Zion.
 Zionism is presented only as an enemy movement: "The Palestinian people are under an oppressive siege, limiting their movement and way of life."
 The false claim is made that an "extremist Zionist" set fire to the Al-Aqsa Mosque in 1969 when in reality it was a mentally unstable fundamentalist Protestant from Australia.
 Sites in Israel are "annexed" to Palestine: "Haifa is a Palestinian seaport", "Galilee, Nazareth and Beit She'an are regions in Palestine",
 The new Palestinian school books stress the importance of "return" of refugees to all of Palestine by violence: "Returning to the homes, the plains and the mountains, under the banners of glory, jihad and struggle."

2007 PMW report and US reactions
In February 2007, Palestinian Media Watch (PMW) released a report entitled "From Nationalist Battle to Religious Conflict: New 12th Grade Palestinian Textbooks Present a World Without Israel" containing analysis of eight textbooks published by the PA at the end of 2006. The US Senator Hillary Clinton joined with PMW for the release of the report written by PMW director Itamar Marcus and associate director Barbara Crook. Sen. Clinton said that the books, which she called "child abuse" and the "glorification of death and violence", caused her to express skepticism about whether Palestinian Authority Chairman Mahmoud Abbas could be a fair partner for peace.

The Grade 12 texts analyzed in the PMW report were the most recent books to be written by the Palestinian Curriculum Development Center. The director of the curriculum committee, Dr. Naim Abu Al-Humos, is a long-time member of the Fatah party and was appointed PA Minister of Higher Education in 2002, under Yasser Arafat, and continued after PA Chairman Mahmoud Abbas's election.

The report states, in part:
The teachings repeatedly reject Israel's right to exist, present the conflict as a religious battle for Islam, teach Israel's founding as imperialism, and actively portray a picture of the Middle East, both verbally and visually, in which Israel does not exist at all.

The following description of Israel's founding represents the dominant dogma about Israel in Palestinian schoolbooks: Defining Israel's founding as a "catastrophe unprecedented in history", "a theft perpetrated by "Zionist gangs", together with numerous other hateful descriptions of Israel as "colonial imperialist" and "racist", compounded by the presentation of the conflict as a religious war, leaves no latitude for students to have positive or even neutral attitudes towards Israel. This negative imagery and religious packaging are compounded by hateful presentations of Israeli policy. The young students are imbued with a Palestinian identity as "victims" just by virtue of Israel's existence. The well-meaning student is left with no logical justification or religious option to accept Israel as a neighbor or to seek coexistence. Given the total rejection of Israel's right to exist, on nationalistic and religious grounds, Palestinian terror against Israel since Israel's founding in 1948 is defined as: "resistance ... acts of most glorious heroism."

PA educators teach that fighting Israel is not merely a territorial conflict, but also a religious battle for Islam. The schoolbooks define the conflict with Israel as "Ribat for Allah" – "one of the actions related to Jihad for Allah, and it means: Being found in areas where there is a struggle between Muslims and their enemies". The report also indicated several instances within these textbooks of what the authors called Holocaust denial. In addition, the report states the text books describe the Islamic World and the United States as being involved in a "Clash of Civilizations" and describes the Iraqi Insurgency as being engaged in "brave resistance to liberate Iraq".

Senator Clinton said:
I believe that education is one of the keys to lasting peace in the Middle East... Ever since we first raised this issue some years ago there still has not been an adequate repudiation of incitement by the Palestinian Authority. It is even more disturbing that the problem appears to have gotten worse. These textbooks don't give Palestinian children an education, they give them an indoctrination.

Senator Clinton joined with Elie Wiesel to speak out about anti-Israel sentiments and antisemitic content in Palestinian textbooks in September 2000. In June 2001, she joined with Senator Charles Schumer to speak out again on the issue, sending a letter to President Bush, urging him to make clear to Yasser Arafat that peace is not possible without a full and immediate cessation of the Palestinian Authority's hateful rhetoric and urging that funding be contingent on the cessation of such incitement. In October 2003, she joined the Senate Labor, HHS and Education Appropriations Subcommittee hearing on Palestinian textbooks and other media that glorifies violence and martyrdom.

2011 IMPACT-SE report
The ongoing research of the Institute for Monitoring Peace and Cultural Tolerance in School Education (IMPACT-SE) on how textbooks, exams, and other official course material in the Middle East portray the "Other" concluded in a 2011 report that Palestinian textbooks portray Jews and Israelis in a negative manner. However, the arguments brought by IMPACT-SE, formerly known as the Center for Monitoring Impact and Peace (CMIP) have been heavily disputed. In particular, according to Prof. Nathan J. Brown, CMIP's "method was to follow harsh criticisms with quotation after quotation purporting to prove a point... In short, the CMIP reports read as if they were written by a ruthless prosecuting attorney anxious for a conviction at any cost... Exaggerated rhetoric, charges of anti-Semitism and racism, and denial of the significance of existing changes in the curriculum will hardly convince any one further improvements are worth the effort."

Reactions 
In 2021, the European Parliament also condemned UNRWA on the grounds that its textbooks call for the destruction of Israel and the establishment of a Palestinian state in place of Israel, West Bank and the Gaza Strip, and encourage children to defend Palestine with their blood. The European Parliament said that it would impose conditions on funds unless the curriculum is immediately changed to encourage coexistence with Israel.

In 2022, the European Parliament's Budgetary Control Committee condemned the Palestinian Authority (PA) for using EU funds to create school books containing violent and hateful content.

See also
 Institute for Monitoring Peace and Cultural Tolerance in School Education
 Pakistani textbooks controversy (Pakistan studies curriculum issues)
 Racism in the Palestinian territories
 Saudi Arabian textbook controversy
 Textbooks in Israel

References

External links
 Israel Foreign Ministry: Behind the Headlines: Hamas' Mickey Mouse teaches children to hate and kill—Important article from MFA, as well as links to several important non-governmental groups, including PMW.
 Center for Monitoring the Impact on Peace 
 Teach Kids Peace
 On The Palestinian School Curriculum: Erasing Israel By David Bedein (The Evening Bulletin) August 28, 2006
 A Regional Perspective on the Arab-Israel Conflict
 Teaching Hatred of Israel and Jews in the New Palestinian Authority Schoolbooks by Itamar Marcus (EUFunding.org), 2003
 Palestinian Education and the Debate Over Textbooks by Aaron D. Pina. April 27, 2005. CRS Report for Congress. Foreign Affairs, Defense, and Trade Division. Order Code RL32886
 The Portrayal of Israel and of the Jew in the Palestinian Authority School Textbooks
 Analysis and Evaluation of the New Palestinian Curriculum; Reviewing Palestinian Textbooks and Tolerance Education Program Grades 5 & 10 by Israel/Palestine Center for Research and Information (IPCRI) Submitted to: The Public Affairs Office US Consulate General Jerusalem, July 2006
 Palestinian Textbooks: A Hindrance to Peace
 Palestinian Children: What are they being Taught?
 One of the worst chapters in Palestinian textbooks The Jerusalem Post

Textbook controversies
Education controversies in the State of Palestine
Israeli–Palestinian conflict
Textbooks in the Middle East
Antisemitism in the Arab world
Education controversies in Israel